Mohammad Aman Ali (born 29 September 1989) is a cricketer who has played one One Day International for the United Arab Emirates.

External links 

1989 births
Living people
Sportspeople from Dubai
Emirati cricketers
United Arab Emirates One Day International cricketers
Pakistani expatriate sportspeople in the United Arab Emirates